Troyan Municipality is a municipality (obshtina) in Lovech Province, Central-North Bulgaria, located from the northern slopes  of the central Stara planina mountain to the area of the Fore-Balkan. It is named after its administrative centre - the town of Troyan.

The area is best known with the Troyan Monastery - the third biggest in Bulgaria, and the north approach to Beklemeto Pass, also known as Troyan Pass, which is one of the connections between the north and south parts of the country.

Settlements 

Troyan Municipality includes the following 22 places (towns are shown in bold):

Demography 
The following table shows the change of the population during the last four decades.

Religion 
According to the latest Bulgarian census of 2011, the religious composition, among those who answered the optional question on religious identification, was the following:

See also
Provinces of Bulgaria
Municipalities of Bulgaria
List of cities and towns in Bulgaria

References

External links
 Official website 

Municipalities in Lovech Province